Love Letters is an LP album by Julie London, released by Liberty Records under catalog number LRP-3231 as a monophonic recording and catalog number LST-7231 in stereo in 1962.

Barney Kessel played guitar on "I Loves You, Porgy," in an arrangement that has similarities to both the 1948 Billie Holiday version and to the 1959 Nina Simone 1959 version of the song, though London sings the song in a slightly higher range than both Holiday and Simone. Ernie Freeman arranged three of the songs on the album.

Track listing

Notes

References

Owen, Michael (2017). Go Slow: The Life of Julie London. Chicago Review Press.

Liberty Records albums
1962 albums
Julie London albums
Albums arranged by Ernie Freeman
Albums produced by Snuff Garrett